The 1946 Toronto Argonauts season was the 57th season for the team since the franchise's inception in 1873. The team finished in second place in the Interprovincial Rugby Football Union with a 7–3–2 record and qualified for the playoffs for the eighth consecutive season. The Argonauts defeated the Montreal Alouettes in the IRFU Final before winning the Eastern Final over the Toronto Balmy Beach Beachers. The defending Grey Cup champion Argonauts faced the Winnipeg Blue Bombers in a rematch of the 33rd Grey Cup game. Toronto prevailed as they won their seventh Grey Cup championship by a score of 28–6.

Preseason

Regular season

Standings

Schedule

Postseason

Grey Cup

November 30 @ Varsity Stadium (Attendance: 18,960)

References

Toronto Argonauts seasons
Grey Cup championship seasons
1946 Canadian football season by team